The 2018 Calcutta Football League Premier Division was the 121st season of the Calcutta Premier Division, a state association football league within the Indian state of West Bengal. The league is divided into two groups – Division A and Division B. The Championship title is awarded only to the Division A winner, while four teams from Division A are relegated to Division B at the end of the season and four teams from Division B are simultaneously promoted to Division A for the next season. The fixtures of Division A and Division B started on 3 August and 5 August 2018 respectively.

Premier Division A

Standings

Results

Managers and foreigners

Stadiums

Attendance

Derby attendance
 Mohun Bagan vs East Bengal FC— 65,322
 Mohun Bagan vs Mohammedan SC— 12,317
 East Bengal Club vs Mohammedan SC— 12,557

Statistics
 Goal by Indians- 58 goals
 Goal by Foreigners- 92 goals

Top scorers

Source: kolkatafootball.com

11 goals
 Ansumana Kromah (Peerless SC)
10 goals
 Aser Pierrick Dipanda (Mohun Bagan)
6 goals
 Joel Sunday (Rainbow)
 Henry Kisekka (Mohun Bagan)
 Bright Middleton Mends (Pathachakra)
5 goals
 John Ampong (Calcutta Customs)
 Stephen Harry (George Telegraph)
  Anthony Wolfe (Peerless SC)
 Justice Morgan (George Telegraph)
 Emmanuel Chinedu (Aryan)
4 goals
 Kamo Stephane Bayi (Tollygunge Agragami)
  Gatch Arthure Diomande (Aryan)
 Philip Adjah (Mohammedan)
 Jobby Justin (East Bengal)
3 goals

 Emmanuel Chigozie (Aryan)
 Eze Stanley Ifeanyi (Calcutta Customs)
 Laldanmawia Ralte (East Bengal)
 Princewell Emeka (Mohammedan)
 Kassim Aidara (East Bengal)
 Lago Dagbo Bei (Tollygunge Agragami)

2 goals

 Poltu Das (Rainbow)
 Anto Pejić (Pathachakra)
 Azharuddin Mallick (Mohun Bagan)
 Gopal Poddar (FCI)
 Sk. Samim (West Bengal Police)
 Narohari Srestha (Peerless SC)
 Ashim Biswas (Tollygunge Agragami)
 Victor Kamhuka (Pathachakra)
 Bubai Das (Pathachakra)
 Ujjal Howladar (Aryan)
 Jhonny Acosta (East Bengal)
 Brandon Vanlalremdika (East Bengal)
 Tirthankar Sarkar (Mohun Bagan)
 Pintu Mahata (Mohun Bagan)

1 goal

 Prosenjit Chakroborty (Mohammedan)
 Lalrindika Ralte (East Bengal)
 Abhishek Ambekar (Mohun Bagan)
 Abhijit Sarkar (Rainbow)
 Lakshmikant Mandi (Peerless SC)
 Sumit Das (Mohammedan)
 Nirmal Singh Bisht (Calcutta Customs)
 Mahmoud Amnah (East Bengal)
 William Lalnunfela (Mohun Bagan)
 Penn Orji (Rainbow)
 Guy Eric Dano (Rainbow)
 Semboi Haokip (West Bengal Police)
 Samad Ali Mallick (East Bengal)
 Britto PM (Mohun Bagan)
 Deep Halder (FCI)
 Daniel Bedemi (Tollygunge Agragami)
 Subho Kumar (George Telegraph)
 Lalramchullova (East Bengal)
 Amit Roy (Calcutta Customs)
 Tonmoy Ghosh (Mohammedan)
 Dipendu Dowary (Mohammedan)
 Shilton D'Silva (Mohun Bagan)
 Mehtab Singh (East Bengal)
 Koushik Sarkar (East Bengal)
 Ram Malik (Calcutta Customs)
 Mrinmoy Samanta (FCI)
 Khokon Das (Rainbow)
 Govin Singh (Tollygunge Agragami)
 Lalchhawnkima (Mohun Bagan)
 Echezona Anyichie (George Telegraph)
  Hira Mondal (Peerless SC)
 Somananda Singh (Pathachakra)
 Kunal Ghosh (Aryan)
 Dipankar Podder (Pathachakra)
 Sujoy Dutta (Rainbow)

Own goals

Source: kolkatafootball.com

 Sandeep Debnath (WBP)

Assists

Clean sheets

Source: kolkatafootball.com

6 clean sheets
 Rakshit Dagar (East Bengal)
 Laltu Mondol (George Telegraph)
4 clean sheets
 Priyant Singh (Mohammedan)
 Sandeep Paul (Peerless)
 Souvik Santra (Aryan)
 Sankar Roy (Mohun Bagan)
 Laltu Mondol (George Telegraph)
3 clean sheets
 Shilton Paul (Mohun Bagan)
 Dibyendu Sarkar (Rainbow)
2 clean sheets

 Suvam Sen (Calcutta Customs)
 Ubaid CK (East Bengal)

1 clean sheets

 Arindam Ghosh (Pathachakra)
 Arup Debnath (Mohammedan)
 Abhijit Das (Pathachakra)

Hat-tricks

Fastest goals

Previous Division B

Standings

Notes: 1.After the completion of the single round robin, the teams will be divided into two groups of top 6 and bottom 4. The top 6 teams will play against each other in a single-leg format, called the championship round, while the bottom 4 teams play against each other in the same single-leg format called the relegation round. Each team carries forward their points and other records from the previous 1st round matches into the championship or the relegation round. Overall 4 teams are promoted.

Results

References

2018–19 in Indian football leagues
Calcutta Premier Division